The 2014 Fareham Borough Council elections took place on 22 May 2014 to elect half the members of Fareham Borough Council in Hampshire, England. The Conservative Party are currently the largest party on the council. The last time these seats were contested was in 2010.

The Conservative Party held every seat they defended and gained one from the Liberal Democrats, in the Fareham North West ward. The Liberal Democrats lost a further two seats: in Stubbington to UKIP, who gained their first councillor, and in Titchfield Common, where the incumbent councillor became an Independent.

After the election, the composition of the council was:
Conservative 24
Liberal Democrat 5
UKIP 1
Independent 1

Election results
The election saw the Conservatives retain control of the council after winning 11 seats compared to 3 for the Liberal Democrats alongside 1 UKIP and 1 Independent, former Liberal Democrat councillor.

Ward Candidates

Fareham East

Fareham North

Fareham North West

Fareham South

Fareham West

Hill Head

Locks Heath

Park Gate

Portchester East

Portchester West

Sarisbury

Stubbington

Titchfield

Titchfield Common

Warsash

References

2014
2014 English local elections
May 2014 events in the United Kingdom
2010s in Hampshire